BODR (an abbreviation for Bacc On Death Row) is the nineteenth studio album by American rapper Snoop Dogg. It was released on February 11, 2022, through Death Row Records, making it his third studio album released on the label following a 26-year lapse. The album was distributed by Create Music Group. It features guest appearances by Nas, T.I., Sleepy Brown, Nate Dogg, The Game, DaBaby, Uncle Murda, Wiz Khalifa and Lil Duval and production by Battlecat, Bink, DJ Green Lantern and Hit-Boy, among others.

Background
On August 23, 2019, American toy company Hasbro announced a $4 billion purchase of eOne, making them the owners of Death Row Records. In April 2021, Hasbro and Entertainment One announced it would sell-off eOne Music to The Blackstone Group. The acquisition was completed in June 2021.

On February 9, 2022, ahead of the release of BODR, Snoop Dogg announced that he would acquire the rights to the Death Row Records trademark from MNRK Music Group (the renamed eOne Music). The sale did not immediately include rights to the label's catalog, but it was reported that he was nearing a deal with MNRK to acquire the catalogs, which includes previous work from himself and other artists such as Dr. Dre, Tha Dogg Pound and 2Pac.

Promotion
Two days after the album release, Snoop performed during the Super Bowl LVI halftime show alongside Dr. Dre, Mary J. Blige, Eminem and Kendrick Lamar.

Commercial performance
BODR debuted at number 104 on the US Billboard 200, becoming his 27th entry on the Billboard 200.

Track listing

Charts

References

2022 albums
Snoop Dogg albums
Death Row Records albums
Albums produced by DJ Green Lantern
Albums produced by Don Cannon
Albums produced by Hit-Boy
Albums produced by Battlecat (producer)
Albums produced by Bink (record producer)
Albums produced by Hi-Tek
Albums produced by Soopafly
Albums produced by Nottz